Di-tert-butylcyclopentadiene is an organic compound with the formula (Me3C)2C5H4, where Me = methyl.  It is a colorless liquid that is soluble in organic solvents.  The compound is the conjugate acid of the di-tert-butylcyclopentadienyl ligand, (Me3C)2C5H3− (sometimes abbreviated Cp‡−). Two regioisomers of di-tert-butylcyclopentadiene exist, depending on the relative location of the double bonds.

Synthesis and reactions
Di-tert-butylcyclopentadiene is prepared by alkylation of cyclopentadiene with tert-butyl bromide under phase-transfer conditions.

It is the precursor to many metal complexes, such as the olefin polymerization catalyst ((Me3C)2C5H3)TiCl3.

The conjugate base of di-tert-butylcyclopentadiene reacts with a third equivalent of tert-butyl bromide to give (Me3C)3C5H3:
(Me3C)2C5H4 + NaH  →  Na(Me3C)3C5H3 + H2
Na(Me3C)2C5H3 + Me3CBr →  (Me3C)3C5H3  +  NaBr

References

Cyclopentadienes
Ligands